Ägelsee (or Egelsee) is a small lake in the municipality of Zeiningen, Canton of Aargau, Switzerland. The 7500 m2 nature preserve is an amphibian spawning area of national importance.

External links
http://www.nvzeiningen.ch 

Lakes of Aargau
Lakes of Switzerland
Protected areas of Switzerland